NS Basic is a family of development tools developed and commercially marketed by NSB  Corporation in Toronto, Ontario, Canada for iOS, Android, Microsoft Windows, MacOS, Linux, BlackBerry OS, WebOS, Newton OS, Palm OS, Windows CE and Windows Mobile.

History 

NSB Corporation was founded by George Henne in 1993 to provide easy development tools for mobile devices. The manufacturers and licensors of the operating systems usually supply a C++-based tool aimed at highly skilled professional developers. NSB/AppStudio provides an alternative using the JavaScript or Basic programming language, similar to Visual Basic. Key developers include George Henne, Marcus Darden, James Kruth, Eric Pepke and Dan Rowley.

As of 2019, NS Basic's tools are used by over three million developers in over 80 countries.

Until 2019, NSB Corporation was known as NS BASIC Corporation.

NSB/AppStudio 

AppStudio was released in December, 2010. It consists of an IDE, a programming language and a deploy module. The IDE and programming language are modeled on Microsoft's Visual Studio. Two languages are supported for development: JavaScript and BASIC. Virtually the entire VBscript syntax is implemented. The runtime environment is based on JavaScript, HTML5 and WebKit: many of the features of the underlying technologies is exposed to the AppStudio environment. Programming can be done in Basic or JavaScript. PhoneGap, jQuery Mobile, Bootstrap and jQWidgets are fully integrated. The programs produced by AppStudio are Web apps.

Apps install themselves as PWA offline web  or native applications. They can run on Apple's iOS devices (iPhone, iPad) and Android devices running 2.1 or later.

AppStudio can also be used to create Electron apps which run on Windows, MacOS and Linux. The use of Nodejs modules is supported.

The latest version of AppStudio 8.5.5.6 was released on Dec 19, 2021.

Example code 

' in BASIC
Function OKButton_onclick()
   MsgBox "Hello World"
End Function

// in JavaScript
OKButton.onclick = function() {
   NSB.MsgBox("Hello World");
}

Retired Products 

NSBasic/Newton, the company's first product, was released on July 1, 1994, and retired in 2002. for the Apple Newton MessagePad. It runs entirely on Newton OS devices. In 1997 it was joined by NewtCard, a Newton HyperCard analogue sold separately. The last version of NS Basic/Newton released was 3.61 in 1998.

NSBasic/CE was released in 1998 and retired in February, 2013. The last version of NSBasic/CE was 8.2.0, released in March, 2010.

NSBasic/Palm was released in 2000 and was retired in 2013. The last version of NSBasic/Palm was 7.0.0, released in February, 2009.

NSBasic/Symbian was released in August, 2008. It was retired in January, 2010.

NSBasic/Desktop was released in 2005 and was retired in 2013. The last version of NS Basic/Desktop was 4.0.0, released in June, 2009.

Mobile Application Development 

The company also undertakes custom development for companies who need applications for mobile devices, such as iPhone, Android, BlackBerry, Windows Mobile, and Palm OS. Applications can be developed for just one platform or for multiple platforms.

References 

Notes
 Verive, Michael (2007). NS Basic Programming for Palm OS, 3rd Edition. The Eastwood Group. .

External links

Apple Newton
BASIC compilers
Integrated development environments
Object-oriented programming languages
Pocket PC software
BASIC programming language family